The gizmo key is a key commonly found on the B foot joint of certain models of flute.  It closes the low B tone hole without closing the low C tone hole or the low C tone hole, which is intended to facilitate the performance of the fourth octave C. 

The gizmo key was introduced by Verne Q. Powell (Powell Flutes), in response to criticisms of the B foot joint by performers such as Jean-Pierre Rampal, who believed that the lengthened tube made it harder for them to produce the highest notes. It is now common on the instrument.

Further reading 
Nancy Toff, The Flute Book (Charles Scribner's Sons, 1985). The Development of the Modern Flute, pp. 23-24

Woodwind instrument parts and accessories
Side-blown flutes